Hampden Bridge is the name of two historic bridges in New South Wales, Australia, named after Lord Hampden, who was Governor of New South Wales from 1895 to 1899.

Historic bridges
 Hampden Bridge, Wagga Wagga, was a wooden Allan Truss bridge built in 1895 located in Wagga Wagga, New South Wales
 Hampden Bridge, Kangaroo Valley, is a sandstone bridge built in 1897 located in Kangaroo Valley, New South Wales